"The Serpentine Offering" is a single by Dimmu Borgir from their 2007 album In Sorte Diaboli. The European version of the single features an instrumental version of "The
Serpentine Offering" and the North American version, instead, features an
instrumental version of "The Heretic Hammer".

Music video 
The video for "The Serpentine Offering" was directed by Patric Ullaeus.

On beginning of the music video, the following lines appear:
 What you believe to be true is false
 What you thought right, wrong

The music video begins with Christian crusaders (Teutonic Knights) raiding a Lithuanian village and slaughtering innocent people. Here, a priest's assistant is shown to dislike killing people just because of faith. When crusaders find a woman, who had just given birth, hiding in the barn and set it afire to incinerate her, the priest's assistant leaves to the forest where he pulls off and throws to the ground the Christian cross he was wearing, symbolizing his rejection of Christianity. Later a group of Lithuanians are shown in a cave in the forest, and later around a fire. In the end of the video they attack and win the battle against the Christian crusaders.

In the end of the music video following lines appear:
 The battle will never end
 In Sorte Diaboli - Antichristus Spiritualis

Track listing

European version
"The Serpentine Offering" (Album Version) – 5:09
"The Serpentine Offering" (Single Version) – 3:37
"The Serpentine Offering" (Instrumental Version) - 5:11

North American Version
"The Serpentine Offering" (Album Version) – 5:09
"The Serpentine Offering" (Single Version) – 3:37
"The Heretic Hammer" (Instrumental Version) - 4:37

7" Version
"The Serpentine Offering" (Single Version) – 3:37
"The Serpentine Offering" (Instrumental Version) - 5:11

Promotional Version
"The Serpentine Offering" (Video Edit) – 4:42

External links 
 The Serpentine Offering on the official Dimmu Borgir website

Dimmu Borgir songs
English-language Norwegian songs
2007 singles
Nuclear Blast Records singles
2007 songs